Jorge Marco de Oliveira Moraes (born 28 March 1996), simply known as Jorge, is a Brazilian professional footballer who plays as a left-back for Fluminense, on loan from Palmeiras.

He is a former member of the Brazil U20 team.

Club career

Flamengo
Born in Rio de Janeiro, Jorge joined Flamengo's youth setup in 2008, aged 11. He made his debut a senior on 16 March 2014, starting in a 2–2 Campeonato Carioca home draw against Bangu.

On 26 September 2014, Jorge signed a new deal with Fla, until December 2017. He was promoted to the main squad in 2015, by manager Vanderlei Luxemburgo.

Jorge made his Série A debut on 1 July 2015, starting in a 1–0 away win against Joinville. He subsequently overtook new signing Pablo Armero as first-choice, and renewed his contract for a further two years on 6 September.

Jorge scored his first top tier goal on 29 May 2016, netting the winner in a 2–1 success over Ponte Preta at the Estádio Moisés Lucarelli. His second goal in the category came on 16 July, in a 3-3 derby against Botafogo.

In September 2016, Brazilian press reported a possible Manchester City interest in signing Jorge. The English club would have begun to watch the left back after having excelled in the 2015 FIFA U-20 World Cup, being elected the best left-back of the competition.

Monaco
On 26 January 2017, AS Monaco FC signed Jorge from Flamengo, after agreeing to a €8.5 million transfer fee for the player. This was the biggest transfer in Flamengo's history at that time. After appearing rarely in his first six months, he became a regular starter during the 2017–18 campaign, replacing departed Benjamin Mendy.

Porto (loan)
On 31 August 2018, it was announced that Jorge would be loaned to Portuguese club FC Porto on a season-long deal with an option to buy. A backup to compatriot Alex Telles, he featured rarely.

Santos (loan)
On 27 March 2019, Jorge returned to Brazil signing with Santos on loan until the end of the year. He made his debut for the club on 4 April, starting in a 1–0 away loss against Atlético Goianiense, for the year's Copa do Brasil. He scored his first goal for the club on April 24th against CR Vasco da Gama on the same tournament.

Basel (loan)
On 2 October FC Basel announced that they had signed in Jorge and that he had signed on a loan contract until the end of the season. After playing in a test game Jorge played his domestic league debut for his new club in the away game in the Kybunpark on 1 November 2020 as Basel won 2–1 against St. Gallen. During the home match in the St. Jakob-Park on 16 December 2020 against Young Boys Jorge was injured and had to be substituted out in the 62nd minute. The injury turned out to be difficult and required an operation and this put him out for the rest of the season. 

Not surprisingly at the end of the season, on 22 May 2021 the club announced that Jorge's loan contract that would expire 30 June 2021 would not be renewed and that he would return to Monaco. In his one season with the club Jorge played a total of seven games for Basel without scoring a goal. Five of these games were in the Nationalliga A and two were friendly games.

International career
On 19 January 2017, Jorge was called up to the Brazil national team for the first time to play a friendly match against Colombia.

Career statistics

Club

International

Honours

Club
Flamengo
 Campeonato Carioca: 2014

Monaco
 Ligue 1: 2016–17

Palmeiras
Copa Libertadores: 2021
Recopa Sudamericana: 2022
Campeonato Paulista: 2022
Campeonato Brasileiro Série A: 2022

National
Brazil U20
FIFA U-20 World Cup runner-up :2015

Individual
 FIFA U-20 World Cup Team of the Tournament: 2015
 Campeonato Brasileiro Série A Team of the Year: 2016
 Bola de Prata: 2019

References

External links

1996 births
Living people
Footballers from Rio de Janeiro (city)
Brazilian footballers
Association football defenders
Campeonato Brasileiro Série A players
CR Flamengo footballers
Santos FC players
Copa Libertadores-winning players
Sociedade Esportiva Palmeiras players
Fluminense FC players
Ligue 1 players
AS Monaco FC players
Liga Portugal 2 players
FC Porto players
FC Basel players
Brazil international footballers
Brazil under-20 international footballers
Brazilian expatriate footballers
Brazilian expatriate sportspeople in Monaco
Brazilian expatriate sportspeople in Portugal
Expatriate footballers in Monaco
Expatriate footballers in Portugal
Expatriate footballers in Switzerland